TBWA\Chiat\Day is the American division of the advertising agency TBWA Worldwide. Created in the 1995 merger of TBWA and Chiat/Day, the agency operates offices in Los Angeles, New York City, Nashville, and Mexico City. Prior to the merger, Chiat/Day created internationally notable advertising, including "1984" for Apple Computer, the advertisement that introduced the Macintosh computer. The merger also inspired the creation of the ad agency St.Lukes by Chiat/Day's London office's employees.

TBWA Worldwide is part of the global marketing group Omnicom, with a reputation for more quirky or "disruptive" work. The youngest network in the group's portfolio, TBWA expanded rapidly in the final years of the 1990s and is a competitor to BBDO and DDB. A significant step came in 1998 when the agency absorbed Anglo-French marketing network GGT BDDP.

The current president of the Los Angeles office is Erin Riley; the New York office is headed by Rob Schwartz.

Portfolio
 "1984" (1983)
 PowerBook 100 campaign with Kareem Abdul-Jabbar (1991)
 Dan & Dave (1992)
 "If only they'd used a Jiffi condom" (1993)
 Jack Box (1993)
 Crash Bandicoot (1996)
 Final Fantasy VII "$20 Million Campaign" (1997)
 "Think Different" campaign (1997)
 Taco Bell chihuahua (1997)
 Bloody Roar (1997)
 Bloody Roar II: The New Breed (1999)
 Gran Turismo 2 (1999)
 Pets.com sock puppet (1999)
 Hummingbird (television ad) Infiniti I35 (2001) 
 Switch (2002)
 Absolut Vodka's "Absolut Marilyn" campaign (2005)
 Keep a Child Alive's "Spirit of a Child" campaign (2005)
 Hello Tomorrow (2005)
 "Get a Mac" campaign (2006)
 Gatorade "G" logo (2009)
 Southwest Airlines' "Welcome Aboard" campaign (2013)
 University of Phoenix (2019)

See also
 Lee Clow
 Jay Chiat
 Guy Day

References

External links
 Official website
 TBWA

Advertising agencies of the United States
Marketing companies established in 1995
Companies based in Los Angeles
Playa Vista, Los Angeles
1995 establishments in California